The white-bearded flycatcher (Phelpsia inornata) is a species of bird in the family Tyrannidae. It is the only member of the genus Phelpsia. It is found in Colombia and Venezuela.

Its natural habitats are subtropical or tropical moist lowland forest and heavily degraded former forest.

References

white-bearded flycatcher
Birds of Venezuela
white-bearded flycatcher
Taxonomy articles created by Polbot